The Workers Revolutionary Party was a left-wing political party in Portugal. It was founded on January 31, 1975.

The party had a Trotskyist orientation, following the line known as "morenista" after Nahuel Moreno.
PRT published Combate Socialista.

PRT was in sympathy with, but not affiliated to, the reunified Fourth International.

In 1978 PRT merged into the Revolutionary Socialist Party, which eventually became part of the Left Bloc.

See also
 Socialist Youth Alliance

References 

Trotskyist organisations in Portugal
Fourth International (post-reunification)
Defunct communist parties in Portugal
Political parties established in 1975
1975 establishments in Portugal
Political parties disestablished in 1978
1978 disestablishments in Portugal